Jan Peszek (born 13 February 1944) is a Polish theatre, film, and television actor. Although primarily involved in theatre work, he has appeared in more than sixty films since 1970. He is most well known for his work with dramaturgist Bogusław Schaeffer.

Biography 
Peszek was born in Szreńsk. In 1966 he finished his education in the AST National Academy of Theatre Arts in Kraków, and made his debut the same year in Bertolt Brecht's The Resistible Rise of Arturo Ui staged at the Polish Theatre in Wrocław.

In 1969 he got cast in his first film role in Andrzej Piotrowski's Znaki na drodze.

In 2014 he received an award from the city Kraków for outstanding achievements in acting.

He has two children, both of whom are engaged in the arts: Maria, a singer and Błażej, an actor. He has strongly criticised the conservative Prawo i Sprawiedliwość party and the affiliated TVP television network.

Selected filmography

References

External links 

1944 births
Living people
Polish male film actors
Polish male stage actors
20th-century Polish male actors
21st-century Polish male actors
People from Mława County